Pinara was an ancient city in Pieria in ancient Syria, mentioned by Pliny the Elder (H.N., v. 19 and v. 22) and Ptolemy (Geography, v. 15. § 12). Its present location has not been precisely determined, but it is known to be north-east of İskenderun in the southern Nur Mountains (then known as the Amanus mountains) in the modern-day Hatay Province of Turkey. The Nur / Amanus mountains separated ancient Cilicia from Coele-Syria. It may have been near Belen, Hatay, near the Belen Pass.

References

Hatay Province
Pieria (Syria)
Former populated places in Turkey
Roman towns and cities in Turkey
Lost ancient cities and towns
Populated places in ancient Cilicia